The stream function is defined for incompressible (divergence-free) flows in two dimensions – as well as in three dimensions with axisymmetry. The flow velocity components can be expressed as the derivatives of the scalar stream function. The stream function can be used to plot streamlines, which represent the trajectories of particles in a steady flow. The two-dimensional Lagrange stream function was introduced by Joseph Louis Lagrange in 1781. The Stokes stream function is for axisymmetrical three-dimensional flow, and is named after George Gabriel Stokes.

Considering the particular case of fluid dynamics, the difference between the stream function values at any two points gives the volumetric flow rate (or volumetric flux) through a line connecting the two points.

Since streamlines are tangent to the flow velocity vector of the flow, the value of the stream function must be constant along a streamline. The usefulness of the stream function lies in the fact that the flow velocity components in the x- and y- directions at a given point are given by the partial derivatives of the stream function at that point.

For two-dimensional potential flow, streamlines are perpendicular to equipotential lines. Taken together with the velocity potential, the stream function may be used to derive a complex potential. In other words, the stream function accounts for the solenoidal part of a two-dimensional Helmholtz decomposition, while the velocity potential accounts for the irrotational part.

Two-dimensional stream function

Definitions

Lamb and Batchelor define the stream function  for an incompressible flow velocity field  as follows. Given a point  and a point ,  

is the integral of the dot product of the flow velocity vector  and the normal  to the curve element  In other words, the stream function  is the volume flux through the curve . The point  is simply a reference point that defines where the stream function is identically zero.

An infinitesimal shift  of the position  results in a change of the stream function:

.

From the exact differential 

the flow velocity components in relation to the stream function  have to be

in which case they indeed satisfy the condition of zero divergence resulting from flow incompressibility, i.e.

Definition by use of a vector potential 
The sign of the stream function depends on the definition used.

One way is to define the stream function  for a two-dimensional flow such that the flow velocity can be expressed through the vector potential 

Where  if the flow velocity vector .

In Cartesian coordinate system this is equivalent to
 

Alternative definition (opposite sign) 
Another definition (used more widely in meteorology and oceanography than the above) is

,

where  is a unit vector in the  direction and the subscripts indicate partial derivatives.

Note that this definition has the opposite sign to that given above, so we have
 

in Cartesian coordinates.

All formulations of the stream function constrain the velocity to satisfy the two-dimensional continuity equation exactly:

The last two definitions of stream function are related through the vector calculus identity

Note that  in this two-dimensional flow.

Derivation of the two-dimensional stream function 
Consider two points A and B in two-dimensional plane flow. If the distance between these two points is very small: δn, and a stream of flow passes between these points with an average velocity, q perpendicular to the line AB, the volume flow rate per unit thickness, δΨ is given by:

As δn → 0, rearranging this expression, we get:

Now consider two-dimensional plane flow with reference to a coordinate system. Suppose an observer looks along an arbitrary axis in the direction of increase and sees flow crossing the axis from left to right. A sign convention is adopted such that the flow velocity is positive.

Flow in Cartesian coordinates 
By observing the flow into an elemental square in an x-y  Cartesian coordinate system, we have:

where u is the flow velocity parallel to and in the direction of the x-axis, and v is the flow velocity parallel to and in the direction of the y-axis. Thus, as δn → 0 and by rearranging, we have:

Continuity: the derivation 
Consider two-dimensional plane flow within a Cartesian coordinate system. Continuity states that if we consider incompressible flow into an elemental square, the flow into that small element must equal the flow out of that element.

The total flow into the element is given by:

The total flow out of the element is given by:

Thus we have:

and simplifying to:

Substituting the expressions of the stream function into this equation, we have:

Vorticity 

The stream function can be found from vorticity using the following Poisson's equation:

or

where the vorticity vector  – defined as the curl of the flow velocity vector  – for this two-dimensional flow has  i.e. only the -component  can be non-zero.

Proof that a constant value for the stream function corresponds to a streamline

Consider two-dimensional plane flow within a Cartesian coordinate system. From calculus we have that

implying that the vector  is normal to the curve . This easily follows,

Properties of the stream function 
 
 The stream function  is constant along any streamline.
 For a continuous flow (no sources or sinks), the volume flow rate across any closed path is equal to zero.
 For two incompressible flow patterns, the algebraic sum of the stream functions is equal to another stream function obtained if the two flow patterns are super-imposed.
 The rate of change of stream function with distance is directly proportional to the velocity component perpendicular to the direction of change.

See also
Elementary flow

References

Citations

Sources

 
  
 
  
 
 

Continuum mechanics
Fluid dynamics

External links

 Joukowsky Transform Interactive WebApp